These are the official results of the Men's 5.000 metres event at the 1997 World Championships in Athens, Greece. There were a total of 38 participating athletes, with two qualifying heats and the final held on Saturday August 9, 1997.

Final

Qualifying heats
Held on Friday 1997-08-08

See also
 1996 Men's Olympic 5.000 metres

References
 Results
 Results - World Athletics

 
5000 metres at the World Athletics Championships